Walter "Newt" Robinson was a Negro league shortstop in the 1920s.

Robinson made his Negro leagues debut with the Hilldale Club during their 1925 Colored World Series championship season. He played for Hilldale again the following season, and finished his career in 1927 with the Lincoln Giants and the Harrisburg Giants.

References

External links
 and Baseball-Reference Black Baseball stats and Seamheads

Place of birth missing
Place of death missing
Year of birth missing
Year of death missing
Harrisburg Giants players
Hilldale Club players
Lincoln Giants players
Baseball shortstops